Richard Lawrence is an art director. He was nominated for an Academy Award in the category Best Art Direction for the film The Right Stuff.

Selected filmography
 The Shootist (1976)
 The Right Stuff (1983)
 Crimson Tide (1995)
 Volcano (1997)
 Lost in Space (1998)

References

External links
 

Year of birth missing (living people)
Living people
Art directors